The 2010 Afghanistan earthquake  occurred on April 18 with a moment magnitude of 5.6. The earthquake could be felt in Mazar-i-Sharif, Kabul, and elsewhere in Afghanistan, as well as in Uzbekistan and Tajikistan. Eleven people were killed and more than 70 were injured. More than two thousand houses were destroyed.

References

External links

Afghanistan earthquake
2010
April 2010 events in Afghanistan
Earthquake
2010 disasters in Afghanistan